The Kyashar (other names  Thangnaktse and Peak 43) is a mountain peak 6769 m height in the Khumbu region in Nepal, east of Namche Bazar in the so-called Hinku Himal. It is located within the Makalu-Barun National Park.

North of Kyashar lies the Kangtega (6783 m), southwest the Kusum Kangguru (6367 m), and the Mera Peak (6476 m) is 6.77 km southeast.

The Kyashar is connected to the Kantega via a ridge. On the west flank flows the Kyashar glacier.

Until 1983, the mountain was named "Peak 43". This year, the Nepalese authorities carried out a naming of mountains and other geographic locations, to "wipe out" a large number of Western names from the map. From 1983 the mountain is Kyashar. The mountain also has a third name, Thangnaktse. At a local level it also appears the name Charpate, which means "square", which is a good description of the shape of mountain peak.

Ascents
The Kyashar was first climbed on 18 October 2003 by Bruce Normand, Andreas Frank and Sam Broderick. The ascent route led over the west ridge and the west wall.

On November 11, 2012, the Japanese Yasuhiro Hanatani, Hiroyoshi Manome and Tatsuya Aoki made the first ascent of the mountain over the south pillar (South Pillar), the so-called NIMA route (2400m, ED +, 5.10a, M5), in alpine style, for what they were awarded the Piolet d'Or.

External links 
 
 Kyashar (Peak 39) in summitpost.org

References 

Six-thousanders of the Himalayas
Mountains of Asia